Yang Hormat Dato' Aaron Mustapha bin Aziz  (Jawi: ارون مصطفى بن عزيز; born 23 February 1976) is a Singaporean actor, singer and film director currently based in Malaysia. He is largely known in Malaysia and also in some countries such as Taiwan, Hong Kong, India, Brunei and Singapore.

He started his acting career in Singapore in 2001 through Shahril in Cinta Bollywood (2001–2002), then acting as Bob in Jeritan Sepi (2002) and as Corporal Jamal Salleh in Heartlanders (2002–2005). His Singaporean television portrayals include Zack Ahmad in sitcom Phua Chu Kang Pte Ltd (season 6) and Iqmal in the drama series Cinta Q.

He migrated to Malaysia in 2004 to begin his acting career as an assistant character in the Haryati drama (2004). His acting credits in Malaysia include Emil Emilda, Sadiq & Co, Nora Elena, Evolusi KL Drift: The Series and Kusinero Cinta. His film credits include Evolusi KL Drift (2008), Bohsia: Jangan Pilih Jalan Hitam (2009), Pisau Cukur (2010), KL Gangster (2011), Ombak Rindu (2011) and Lari (2013).

On 16 December 2017, he was awarded the Darjah Kebesaran Mahkota Pahang Yang Dihormati (Darjah Indera Mahkota Pahang) by Sultan Ahmad Shah of Pahang in conjunction with the Sultan's birthday for his contributions to the Malay entertainment industry.

Honour

Honours of Malaysia
:
 Knight Companion of the Esteemed Order of the Crown of Pahang (Darjah Kebesaran Mahkota Pahang Yang Dihormati) (16 December 2017) which is carried the title of Dato'

Filmography

Film

Television series

Telemovie

Television

Music video

Discography

Awards and nominations

Anugerah Bintang Popular Berita Harian 

|-
| 2007 || Janji Diana || Most Popular TV Actor || 
|-
| 2008 || Emil Emilda || Most Popular TV Actor || 
|-
| 2009 || Rahsia Hati / Evolusi KL Drift || Most Popular TV / Film Actor || 
|-
| 2010 || Habil & Qabil / Evolusi KL Drift 2 || Most Popular TV / Film Actor || 
|-
| rowspan="3"|2011 || Nora Elena || Most Popular TV Actor || 
|-
| Ombak Rindu || Most Popular Film Actor || 
|-
| Ombak Rindu || Most Popular Artiste || 
|-
| 2012 || Adam dan Hawa || Most Popular TV Actor || 
|-
| rowspan="2"|2013 || KL Gangster 2 || Most Popular Film Actor || 
|-
| KL Gangster 2 || Most Popular Artiste || 
|-

Pesta Perdana (MediaCorp Suria) 

|-
| 2002 || Cinta Bollywood || Best Male Actor in Supporting Role || 
|-
| 2003 || Garisan Takdir || Most Popular Artiste || 
|-
| 2004 || Permintaan Aishah & Leftenan Adnan – A Life Story || Most Popular Artiste – Top 3 || 
|-
| rowspan="2"|2005 || Dol & Minah Nak Kahwin || Best Comedy Act || 
|-
| Dol & Minah Nak Kahwin || Most Popular Artiste ||

References

External links 
Official website
 

1976 births
Living people
Singaporean male film actors
Singaporean male television actors
Singaporean people of Malay descent
Singaporean expatriates in Malaysia
Singaporean expatriate actors
Singaporean emigrants to Malaysia
Singaporean Muslims